Rai Utile was an Italian TV channel devoted to Italian government and administration, owned by RAI and launched in 2004.

Has shared its frequencies to Rai Festival during the Festival della canzone italiana in April 2004, to Rai Azzurri during the UEFA Euro 2004 (from 11 June 2004) and to Rai Olimpia during the 2004 Summer Olympics.

Due to low ratings, it was closed down in 2008 and replaced by Rai Gulp.

Utile
Italian-language television stations
Television channels and stations established in 2004
Television channels and stations disestablished in 2008